Community Healthcare Network (CHN) provides primary care, mental health and social services in New York City. All of its locations are designated as a Federally Qualified Health Center by the Bureau of Primary Health Care. It is also an affiliate member of NewYork-Presbyterian Hospital.

History
In 1981, twelve family planning clinics started in the late 1960s in New York City merged to become the Community Family Planning Council. In 1984, the clinics became the first family planning provider in New York State to offer prenatal care and professional social work services. The clinics expanded to include primary care, mental health and social services and in 1998 the name was changed to Community Healthcare Network.
Catherine M. Abate has been president and CEO since 1999, until her death in 2014.
Robert Hayes is currently the President and CEO.

Location

Manhattan
Catherine M. Abate Health Center (formerly downtown health center)
Community League Health Center
Helen B. Atkinson Health Center

Brooklyn
CABS Health Center
Caribbean House Health Center
Dr. Betty Shabazz Health Center

Bronx
Bronx Health Center
Tremont Health Center

Queens
Long Island City Health Center
Queens Health Center
Family Health Center

Other
CHN also operates three mobile health units. Two are dedicated to general care, one is dedicated to ocular care.

Awards and recognition
In 2007, Community Healthcare Network received accreditation from The Joint Commission by demonstrating compliance with national standards for health care quality and safety.

See also
 The New York Foundation

References

External links
 

Medical and health organizations based in New York (state)
Health centers
Clinics in New York City
NewYork–Presbyterian Hospital